Stephanie Rogers is an American poet from Ohio who now lives in New York City.

Life
Originally from Ohio, she graduated from the University of North Carolina, Greensboro's Master of Fine Arts program in 2007.  She has also studied at Ohio State University and the University of Cincinnati.  In 2008, she and Amber Leab co-founded the feminist film review website Bitch Flicks.

Her work appears in Southern Review, Pleiades, Cream City Review, Madison Review, and The Pinch.

She lives in New York City.

Works
"Dear Sophia"; "Beating the Shit out of my Despair", Symphony for Red', "The Incident When my Dog Dies and/or You Leave Me"'

Anthologies

References

External links
 Stephanie Rogers

University of Cincinnati alumni
University of North Carolina at Greensboro alumni
Ohio State University alumni
Year of birth missing (living people)
Living people
American women poets
21st-century American women